QuiteRSS is an open source cross-platform news aggregator for RSS and Atom news feeds. QuiteRSS is free software released under the GPL-3.0-or-later license. It is available for Microsoft Windows, MacOS, Linux, and OS/2. It has two layout modes—classic and newspaper. The classic layout has a three-panel view for the feed list, posts and browser. It supports tabbed browsing, import/export of OPML feeds, basic web browsing functions, adblocking, tags and system tray integration. It uses the WebKit browsing engine for its embedded browser

References

News aggregator software
Free and open-source software
Software articles needing attention